KP Media was a Ukrainian publishing company who published several magazines, including Korrespondent, Novynar, an English language newspaper, Kyiv Post, and owned several internet websites.

History
KP Media was founded in September 1995 by American Jed Sunden, and its first publication was Kyiv Post, from which it takes its name.

KP Media sold Kyiv Post to Mohammad Zahoor, the husband of Ukrainian pop singer Kamaliya, on 28 July 2009.

References

External links
Official site of the company

1995 establishments in Ukraine
Mass media companies of Ukraine
Publishing companies established in 1995
Publishing companies of Ukraine
Ukrainian brands